John Graeme of Newton (died 3 January 1773), referred to as the Earl of Alford in Jacobite circles, was a Scottish Jacobite agent and minister who was Secretary of State to the exiled James Francis Edward Stuart.

Graeme was the eldest son and heir of James Graeme of Newton, Solicitor General for Scotland in 1688. He was a Scottish Protestant. On 6 September 1726 he was knighted and made a baronet by the exiled James III & VIII for his services at the Jacobite court in Vienna. He was appointed Secretary of State from May 1727 to August 1728, when he asked to be relieved of his duties. He returned to the Jacobite court at the Palazzo Muti in 1759 when the exiled King made him a minister, serving in the role until 1763. On 20 January 1760 he was made Earl of Alford, Viscount of Falkirk and Baron Newton in the Jacobite peerage. He retired to Paris and died at the Scots College in 1773 without heirs.Melville, Henry Massue Ruvigny Et Raineval. The Jacobite Peerage, Baronetage, Knightage, and Grants of Honour.  Genealogical Publishing, 2003, p.215.

References

Year of birth unknown
1773 deaths
18th-century Scottish people
Earls in the Jacobite peerage
Scottish expatriates in France
Scottish Jacobites